The Jubilee Walkway is an official walking route in London. It was originally opened as the Silver Jubilee Walkway to commemorate Queen Elizabeth II's accession; the Queen herself opened it on 9 June 1977 during her silver jubilee celebrations. The intention was to connect many of London's major tourist attractions and it is now one of seven such walks within the Mayor of London's strategic walking routes. Its length is 15 miles.

The Jubilee Walkway Trust was set up in 1978 to look after the trail, in collaboration with local authorities.

On 24 October 2002, during the Queen's golden jubilee, the renamed Jubilee Walkway (the word Silver was dropped as appropriate) reopened after refurbishment and a new spur walk was opened in 2003, called the Camden loop, which took walkers into north-west London.

The Jubilee Walkway can be divided into five smaller loop walks: the Western loop, Eastern loop, City loop, Camden loop and Jubilee loop.

Major sites 
Western loop
The longest loop within the Jubilee Walkway, the Western loop is six miles in length and originates at Leicester Square in the West End of London. Walking in an anti-clockwise direction, some of the major sites taken in on the loop include:

National Gallery
Trafalgar Square
Admiralty Arch
St. James's Park
Parliament Square
Westminster Abbey
Lambeth Palace
London Eye
OXO Tower
Tate Modern
Millennium Footbridge
St Paul's Cathedral
Lincoln's Inn Fields
Sir John Soane's Museum
Royal Opera House
Covent Garden
London Transport Museum
National Portrait Gallery

Eastern loop
Five miles in length, the Eastern loop originates at the Tate Modern. Walking in an anti-clockwise direction, some of the main attractions on the Eastern loop include:

Shakespeare's Globe Theatre
Golden Hinde
Southwark Cathedral
Hay's Galleria

City Hall
Tower Bridge
Tower of London
St Katharine Docks
The Monument
Bank of England
Royal Exchange
Mansion House
Millennium Footbridge

City loop
The City loop is the shortest of the five on the Jubilee Walkway and originates at Bank junction in the heart of the City of London. Walking anti-clockwise, the major sites on the City loop include:

No 1 Poultry
The Guildhall
Guildhall Art Gallery
London Wall
Barbican Centre
St. Giles' church
Museum of London
One New Change
Paternoster Square
London Stock Exchange
St Paul's Cathedral
City of London School

Camden loop
The three-mile Camden loop originates on Chancery Lane. Walking in an anti-clockwise direction, the major points of interest on the Camden loop include:

Maughan Library
Coram's Fields
Brunswick Square
Brunswick Centre
British Library
University College London
School of Oriental and African Studies
British Museum

Jubilee loop

The fifth and final sub-loop on the walkway is the 1.7-mile Jubilee loop, originating at Trafalgar Square and focusing on the British monarchy. Walking in an anti-clockwise direction, the main attractions on the Jubilee loop include:

Admiralty Arch
Victoria Memorial
Buckingham Palace
Birdcage Walk
St Stephen's Club
Wellington Barracks
Parliament Square
St. James's Park

References

External links
Jubilee Walkway - Transport for London
Detailed interactive map
The Jubilee Walkway on the Go Jauntly app, in partnership with Transport for London.

Long-distance footpaths in England
Footpaths in London
Walkway
Golden Jubilee of Elizabeth II